Matthew Boyden may refer to:

 Matthew Boyden, a character from the British television series The Bill
 Matthew Boyden (cricketer) (born 1979), former English cricketer